Dolný Chotár is a village and municipality in Galanta District of  the Trnava Region of south-west Slovakia.

Geography
The municipality lies at an elevation of 110 metres and covers an area of 13.882 km². It has a population of about 205 people.

History
In the 9th century, the territory of Dolný Chotár became part of the Kingdom of Hungary. In historical records, the village was first mentioned in 1960.
After the Austro-Hungarian army disintegrated in November 1918, Czechoslovak troops occupied the area, later acknowledged internationally by the Treaty of Trianon. Between 1938 and 1945, Dolný Chotár once more  became part of Miklós Horthy's Hungary through the First Vienna Award. From 1945 until the Velvet Divorce, it was part of Czechoslovakia. Since then, it has been part of Slovakia.

References

External links

Villages and municipalities in Galanta District
Hungarian communities in Slovakia